Camp de Tarragona is a railway station, opened on 19 December 2006, on the Madrid-Barcelona high-speed rail line between Madrid and Barcelona. Located between the municipalities of La Secuita and Perafort, some 8 km north of Tarragona itself, the new station serves an area with an estimated population of over 400,000.

The station complex, covering 5.2 hectares, has eight standard-gauge tracks (four platform tracks and four central through tracks), two 400-metre-long island platforms, passenger handling facilities, a travel centre, shops, and parking for 648 vehicles.

The high speed railway to the French frontier opened for service in 2013.

Rail services

References

External links
 Camp de Tarragona listing at Adif website
 Information and photos of the station at Trenscat.com 
 

Madrid–Barcelona high-speed rail line
Railway stations in Catalonia
Railway stations in Spain opened in 2006
Transport in Tarragonès